WHNE-LD (channel 3) is a low-power television station in Detroit, Michigan, United States, affiliated with TheGrio TV. Owned and operated by Bridge Media Networks, the station has studios and transmitter located in Oak Park, Michigan.

History

Early history
The station was originally owned by P&P Cable Holdings as W52CU and was licensed to Pinconning. P&P sold many of its stations and construction permits to NTN Saginaw, W52CU was one of these. W52CU never signed on in Pinconning.

In late 2005, Tait Broadcasting acquired W52CU and relocated the station to Flint, where it signed on as WHNE-LP on channel 32.

The WHNE calls were originally used on radio in the Detroit area; first from 1973 to 1978 on what is now WCSX (94.7 FM).

Until May 2006, WHNE was affiliated with Urban America Television; WHNE switched to America One after UATV suspended operations.

Tower relocation to Holly, digital operations
In 2010, the station relocated to a digital signal on channel 26, as WHNE-LD, now located at its new tower location. The directional antenna was designed to protect low-power WLPC-LP operating on channel 26 in Detroit. WLPC-LP had a construction permit to move to digital channel 40. After receiving the construction permit for its new tower site on channel 26, the station applied for additional power, which was granted after approval from the FCC and its Canadian counterpart, the CRTC.

On December 28, 2011, the station returned to the air, broadcasting from a transmitter tower near Holly at the East Holly Road and Interstate 75 (Exit 98) interchange, on UHF 26, and with a PSIP of 26.1 along with four sub channels.  The transmitter had a directional antenna pattern mainly to the northwest towards Flint and the southeast towards Pontiac, with its reception area covering both cities.

Move to Detroit
Coincidentally, shortly after the station was nearly ready to transmit with increased power, the CRTC switched CHWI-DT-60 in Windsor, Ontario to channel 26.  This left WHNE no other choice but to apply for a different channel to avoid any co-channel interference with CHWI.

The only channel found to use was UHF 20, which was previously occupied by the analog signal of WMYD in Detroit, which switched to digital on UHF channel 21. So WHNE filed an application to relocate its transmitter to WMYD's tower in Oak Park and to broadcast on channel 20, focusing on the Metro Detroit area, changing its city of license to Detroit. On March 27, 2012, the station was granted a construction permit to move to UHF channel 20 in Oak Park at 15 kW.  In order to avoid a potential PSIP/virtual channel conflict with CHWI-DT-60, the station applied to the FCC to use 14 for its virtual channel, on April 30, 2014.

On September 21, 2014, the station returned to the air for testing at its new Oak Park facility, transmitting signal which covered much of the Metro Detroit area and nearby portions of Windsor and Essex County.

From September 21, 2014 until sometime in 2015, WHNE-LD was an affiliate of Soul of the South Network on 14.1. However, it was removed from the station when the network filed for bankruptcy in 2015 and couldn't pay most of its affiliates.

On November 22, 2015, the station added SonLife to 14.5. Until then, subchannel 14.5 was an affiliate of both Corner Store TV and Jewelry TV.   In April 2016, the station launched a website and added LATV to 14.1, becoming Detroit's only over-the-air non-English television station since WUDL-LD dropped the TBN Enlace USA service on that station's 47.5 subchannel along with all other Trinity Broadcasting Network-related networks on other subchannels of that station after Regal Media sold it to King Forward, Inc. in 2015. In May 2017, LATV was replaced with infomercials. Light TV was added to 14.1 on August 24, 2017.

The move to low VHF

May 25, 2018 saw WHNE-LD receive its post-repack channel frequency: VHF 3, with an effective radiated power of 3 kW.

Signals on the low VHF band (channels 2 thru 6) travel better than signals on other bands, but require longer antennas (approximately 8 feet long) to receive due to the longer wavelength, and are especially prone to interference from electrical appliances and, especially in the case of metro Detroit, industrial noise. Interference had very little, if any, effect on analog signals, but can obliterate digital signals, which is compounded by WHNE's low power. As a result, the required move was met with negative backlash before it even happened.

WHNE-LD would sign off from channel 20 for the final time on March 13, 2020, vacating the frequency for Detroit Public Television.  The station was delayed from signing back on at VHF 3 due to its new antenna being delayed during shipping due to the COVID-19 pandemic temporarily closing the ports in Italy, where the antenna parts were purchased from, as detailed in their station's Facebook page.  The station managed to find an alternate source for its antenna parts by March 20, however, and planned to resume broadcasting by April 3 or 4, 2020, with a new station branding as TV-3 (with a PSIP of 3.x), but actually ended up returning on April 1.

Sale to Bridge Media Networks
On September 29, 2022, NEWSnet's parent company Bridge Media Networks (backed by 5-hour Energy creator Manoj Bhargava) announced it would acquire WHNE-LD for $1.65 million. Upon the completion of the transaction, Bridge would make WHNE-LD the second NEWSnet owned-and-operated station in Michigan (the first being flagship WMNN-LD [channel 26], licensed to Lake City and serving the Traverse City-Cadillac DMA). The sale was consummated on November 28.

Technical information

Subchannels
The station's digital signal is multiplexed:

References

External links

HNE-LD
Television channels and stations established in 1996
Low-power television stations in the United States
TheGrio affiliates
NewsNet affiliates
GetTV affiliates
Heartland (TV network) affiliates
Retro TV affiliates